Raymond Ackerman may refer to:

 Raymond Ackerman (filmmaker) or C. Fred Ackerman (1873–1938), American journalist and filmmaker
 Raymond Ackerman (businessman) (born 1931), South African businessman